Edward John O'Sullivan (11 June 1919 – 7 January 1996) was an Irish hurler who played at club level with Blackrock and at inter-county level with the Cork senior hurling team. He usually lined out as a forward. Following his retirement from GAA he took up golf and was the winner of the senior scratch cup in his home Club of Douglas Golf Club in 1969.

Career

O'Sullivan was a dual player at club level, lining out with Blackrock in hurling and St. Vincent's in Gaelic football. He captained the latter to defeat by Millstreet in the 1948 Cork SFC final, having won a Cork JFC title two years previously. O'Sullivan's club hurling career coincided with a 25-year drought for Blackrock. After captaining the team to county final defeats in 1948 and 1954, he finally won a Cork SHC title in 1956. O'Sullivan first appeared on the inter-county scene as a member of the unsuccessful Cork minor football team in 1938. He made his debut with the Cork senior hurling team in a tournament game against Dublin in 1943, however, it would be a number of years before he joined the team properly. O'Sullivan was a reserve when Cork beat Kilkenny in the 1946 All-Ireland final. He was once again on the bench the following year when the result was reversed. O'Sullivan was also a part of Cork's 1947–48 National League-winning team.

Death

O'Sullivan died at Heatherside Hospital in Buttevant, County Cork on 7 January 1996.

Honours

St Vincent's
Cork Junior A Football Championship: 1946
City Junior A Football Championship: 1946, 1950

Blackrock
Cork Senior Hurling Championship: 1956

Cork
All-Ireland Senior Hurling Championship: 1946
Munster Senior Hurling Championship: 1946, 1947
National Hurling League: 1947–48

References

1919 births
1996 deaths
Blackrock National Hurling Club hurlers
St Vincent's (Cork) Gaelic footballers
Cork inter-county hurlers
Cork inter-county Gaelic footballers
All-Ireland Senior Hurling Championship winners